Humber may refer to:

Rivers
 The Humber, a river and large tidal estuary in northern England.
 Humber River (Newfoundland and Labrador), Newfoundland and Labrador, Canada
 Humber River (Toronto), Ontario, Canada

People
 Humber the Hun was a legendary king of the Huns
 Philip Humber, a pitcher in Major League Baseball
 Richard A. Humber, American mycologist
 Thomas Humber, founder of the Humber bicycle company

Places
 Humber, Devon, England, UK
 Humber, Herefordshire, England, UK

Education
 Humber College, both campuses in Toronto, Ontario, Canada

Vehicles
 Humber Limited manufactured cars, commercial vehicles, bicycles and motorcycles. It was from 1932 a member of the Rootes Group
 Humber Light Reconnaissance Car, Humber Scout Car and Humber Armoured Car were British reconnaissance vehicles during World War II.
 Humber Cycles
 Humber Motorcycles

Vessels
 HMS Humber was the name of nine ships of the Royal Navy.

Public Transportation
Humber Loop, a streetcar loop on the Toronto streetcar system.

Geology
 Humber Zone, one of the 5 tectonostratographic zones of the Appalachian Mountains
Information Technology